Miss France 2008, the 78th edition of the Miss France pageant, was held in Dunkirk, Nord-Pas-de-Calais on December 8, 2007.

The ceremony was held at TF1, and was presented by Jean-Pierre Foucault and the Miss France Committee President Geneviève de Fontenay.

Valérie Bègue of Réunion  was crowned Miss France 2008 by the outgoing title-holder Rachel Legrain-Trapani of Picardy, Miss France 2007. Bègue was originally supposed to represent France at Miss World 2008 and Miss Universe 2008, but she was replaced by 2nd Runner-Up, Laura Tanguy of Pays de Loire after suggestive photos of Bègue were released to the public and Bègue refused to resign. A compromise was reached that allowed her to keep the title of Miss France 2008 but she was barred from crowning her successor the following year and was stripped of her right to represent France at any international beauty pageant.

Results

Contestants

Crossovers 
Contestants who previously competed or will be competing at international beauty pageants:

Miss Universe
2008:  Pays de Loire - Laura Tanguy
 (Nha Trang)

Miss World
2008:  Pays de Loire - Laura Tanguy
 (Johannesburg)

Miss International
2008:  Bourgogne - Vicky Michaud
 (Macau)
2010:  Alsace - Florima Treiber (Top 15)
 (Chengdu)

Miss Model of the World
2008:  Auvergne - Emmanuelle Lemery
 (Buenos Aires)
2010:  Albigeois Midi-Toulousain - Eurydice Rigal (6th Runner-up)
 (Shenzhen)

Miss Asia Pacific World
2011:  Alsace - Florima Treiber
 (Viña Del Mar)

References

External links
Official Website

Miss France
2007 in France
2007 beauty pageants
December 2007 events in France